The following is a list of county routes in Bergen County in the U.S. state of New Jersey.  For more information on the county route system in New Jersey as a whole, including its history, see County routes in New Jersey.

500-series county routes
In addition to those listed below, the following 500-series county routes serve Bergen County:

CR 501, CR 502, CR 503, CR 504, CR 505, CR 507

Other county routes

History 
Bergen County has one of the longest-lasting county route systems in New Jersey, being one of only two counties in the state not to switch to a 600-series system with the introduction of the 500-series routes. Bergen County's system dates to the 1920s, and the current system has few changes from its first implementation.

There were two implementations of longer-distance routes. In the late 1930s, a group of three roads in Bergen County received the numbers 200, 201, and 203. 200 ran from Oakland to Alpine; 201 ran from Ridgewood to Alpine; and 203 ran from Weehawken to Alpine. This was the precursor to the 500 series, though with the advent of that system, the 200-series were eliminated by the 1960s. In the late 1950s and early 1960s, the county experimented with long-distance routes to cover the whole county. These were numbered from 1 to 17; north–south routes were given odd numbers, and increased numerically from west to east, and east–west routes were given even numbers, and increased numerically north to south. The routes were signed, but have fallen out of fashion to the extent that the NJDOT no longer recognizes them in their route logs.

See also

References

 
Bergen